The 16th Alpini Regiment is an inactive regiment of the Italian Army's mountain infantry speciality, the Alpini, which distinguished itself in combat during World War I and World War II.

History 
The regiment was formed on 19 September 1991 by elevating the existing Alpini Battalion "Belluno" to regiment. Between 1 October 1910 and 11 November 1975 the battalion was one of the battalions of the 7th Alpini Regiment. After the 7th Alpini Regiment was disbanded during the 1975 Italian Army reform the Alpini Battalion "Belluno", based in Belluno, became one of the battalions of the Alpine Brigade "Cadore". As the traditions and flag of the 7th Alpini Regiment were assigned to the "Feltre" battalion, the Belluno battalion was granted a new war flag on 12 November 1976 by decree 846 of the President of the Italian Republic Giovanni Leone. The Silver Medal of Military Valour awarded to the 7th Alpini Regiment for the regiment's service in the Greco-Italian war, and the Gold Medal of Civil Valour awarded to the 7th Alpini Regiment for its service after the Vajont disaster, were duplicated for the new flag of the Belluno battalion.

The main task of the regiment was to train recruits destined for the Alpini regiments based in the Veneto and Friuli-Venezia Giulia regions of northern Italy. In January 1997 the "Cadore" brigade was disbanded and the regiment passed to the Alpine Brigade "Julia". Soon afterwards the Julia ceded the regiment to the Alpine Troops Command. With the suspension of compulsory military service the regiment was dissolved on 30 November 2004. During its short existence the regiment trained approximately 85,000 soldiers.

Structure 
When the regiment was disbanded it had the following structure:

  Regimental Command
  Command and Logistic Support Company
  Alpini Battalion "Belluno"
  77th Alpini Company
  78th Alpini Company
  79th Alpini Company
  116th Mortar Company (in reserve status since 1975)

External links
 16th Alpini Regiment on vecio.it

Source 
 Franco dell'Uomo, Rodolfo Puletti: L'Esercito Italiano verso il 2000 - Volume Primo - Tomo I, Rome 1998, Stato Maggiore dell'Esercito - Ufficio Storico, page: 512

References 

Alpini regiments of Italy
Military units and formations established in 1991
Military units and formations disestablished in 2004
1991 establishments in Italy